Working Class Hero is a film production company partnered by Dileesh Pothan and Syam Pushkaran. The company was launched in 2018 with first project being Kumbalangi Nights in 2019 co-produced with Fahadh Faasil and Friends. Their latest production is Thankam, co-produced by Bhavana Studios with Fahadh Faasil & Friends.

Films

Kumbalangi Nights (2019) 
Kumbalangi Nights was directed by Madhu C. Narayanan and was written by Syam Pushkaran which was jointly produced by Fahadh Faasil and Nazriya Nazim under their production house Fahadh Faasil and Friends, in association with Dileesh Pothan and Syam Pushkaran under Working Class Hero. The film starred actors Shane Nigam, Soubin Shahir, Fahadh Faasil and Sreenath Bhasi, along with newcomers Anna Ben and Mathew Thomas. Shyju Khalid did the cinematography for the film, while the soundtrack and score were composed by Sushin Shyam. The film received multiple awards and was selected by various film festivals in India and around the world.

Joji (2021) 
Joji is the second project of the company, directed by Dileesh Pothan and is written by Syam Pushkaran. The theme of the film is inspired from the William Shakespeare’s epic tragedy Macbeth in an independent way. The film stars Fahadh Faasil, Baburaj, Shammi Thilakan and Unnimaya Prasad in the lead roles. The film is produced by Bhavana Studios in association with Working Class Hero and Fahadh Faasil and Friends company. The film was announced on October 3rd 2020, along with the title poster. The film was released on April 7th 2021 as an Amazon Direct Release in 240 countries around the world. Dileesh Pothan won the award for the Best Director for Joji in 52nd Kerala State Film Awards, Syam Pushkaran won the award for the Best Adapted Screenplay for Joji’s script based on Shakespeare’s Macbeth. Unnimaya Prasad's performance in Joji won her the Best Character Actor (Female) award. While Justin Varghese won award for the Best Background Score

Palthu Janwar (2022) 
Palthu Janwar is directed by Sangeeth P Rajan, written by Vinoy Thomas and Aneesh Anjali. Basil Joseph will be playing the lead role while actors Indrans, Johny Antony, Dileesh Pothan, Shammy Thilakan, Sruthy Suresh, Jaya Kurup, Athira Harikumar, Thankam Mohan, Steffy Sunny, Vijayakumar, Kiran Peethambaran, Siby Thomas, and Joji John will be in the pivotal roles. The cinematography department is handled by Renadive while the editing is by Kiran Das. The Music for the movie is composed by Justin Varghese. The film is set for an Onam Theatrical Release by Bhavana Release.

Thankam (2023) 
Thankam is a Malayalam crime drama film directed by Saheed Arafath and penned by Syam Pushkaran. The film is jointly produced by Fahadh Faasil, Dileesh Pothan, and Syam Pushkaran. In the title poster, it was announced that Fahadh Faasil, Joju George, Aparna Balamurali and Dileesh Pothan will be in the lead roles. However, the production was postponed due to the COVID-19 pandemic. The filming of the movie began on 29 May 2022 with Vineeth Sreenivasan and Biju menon in the lead which were the originally planned cast initially. The film released on 26 January 2023 and quickly became a critical and commercial success.

Filmography

Accolades

References

External links 
 
 Official Facebook Page

Film production companies of Kerala
Film distributors of India
Indian companies established in 2018
2018 establishments in Kerala
Companies based in Kochi
Mass media companies established in 2018